Čamovce is a village and municipality in the Lučenec District in the Banská Bystrica Region of Slovakia.

History
The village arose in the 12th century. It was first mentioned in 1240 (Chama) . It belonged to Hajnáčka and, successively, to the families Feledyi, Lorantfy, Vecsény and Vay. It suffered under Turkish attacks; the Turks imposed to the village to pay taxes in the form of wood and horseshoes. Turkish incursion ended only in 1683, when the Turks burned the village down. From 1938 to 1944 it briefly returned to Hungary under the First Vienna Award.

Genealogical resources

The records for genealogical research are available at the state archive "Statny Archiv in Banska Bystrica, Slovakia"

 Roman Catholic church records (births/marriages/deaths): 1787-1898 (parish B)

See also
 List of municipalities and towns in Slovakia

External links
http://www.statistics.sk/mosmis/eng/run.html
http://www.camovce.gemer.org/
http://www.camovce.ou.sk/
http://www.e-obce.sk/obec/camovce/camovce.html
Surnames of living people in Camovce

Villages and municipalities in Lučenec District